California's coastal salt marsh is a wetland plant community that occurs sporadically along the Pacific Coast from Humboldt Bay to San Diego. This salt marsh type is found in bays, harbors, inlets, and other protected areas subject to tidal flooding.

Plant habitat 
Plant species in this community are halophytes adapted to the saline conditions and low oxygen content typically found in the water-saturated soils. As a result of the demanding conditions, species diversity is relatively low.

Typical plant species in this community include:

Salt grass (Distichlis spicata)
Franconia (Frankenia salina)
Pickleweed and glasswort  (Salicornia spp.)
Cordgrass (Spartina foliosa)
Seep weed (Suaeda californica)

Plants occur in bands that are determined by the amount of submergence a species can  tolerate.  Most tolerant of submergence is cordgrass which has a hollow stem that allows oxygen to reach its roots . Further inland, pickleweeds and glassworts are predominant where their roots are flooded only during the highest tides.  The salt-marsh bird’s-beak (Cordylanthus maritimus) is an endangered plant species that occurs in this habitat.

Animal habitat 
Few terrestrial animals inhabit the coastal salt marsh.  One endangered mammal is the salt marsh harvest mouse (Reithrodontomys raviventris) which  occurs in the San Francisco Bay region. Likewise, only five species of birds are resident in this habitat and four are considered rare or endangered.

See also 
	
 Plant communities of California
 Ecology
 Natural environment

References

Ornduff, Robert. (2003) Introduction to California Plant Life. Revised by Phyllis M. Faber and Todd Keeler-Wolf. University of California Press.
Schoenherr, Allan A. (1992) A Natural History of California. University of California Press.

Plant communities of California
Salt marsh plants
 
 
Habitats
Environment of California